The Minister of State Owned Enterprises is the government minister in New Zealand responsible for trading enterprises owned by the New Zealand Government (see State-owned enterprises of New Zealand), usually in conjunction with the minister responsible for the industry.

The post was established by the Fourth Labour Government from 1 April 1987. Some of the SOEs were formerly trading departments, like the New Zealand Post Office and the New Zealand Railways Department.

History
The following ministers have held the office of Minister of State Owned Enterprises.

Key

Notes

References 

Lists of government ministers of New Zealand
Political office-holders in New Zealand